Roger Sinclair Aytoun (18 February 1823 – 1904) was a Scottish Liberal politician who sat in the House of Commons from 1862 to 1874.

Biography
Aytoun was born at Edinburgh, the son of John Aytoun of Inchdairnie, Fifeshire and his wife Margaret Anne Jeffery, daughter of J. Jeffery M.D. He was educated at Trinity College, Cambridge graduating B.A. in 1845 and M.A. in 1848. He was a Deputy Lieutenant and J.P. of Fifeshire.

In 1862 Aytoun was elected Member of Parliament for Kirkcaldy Burghs. He held the seat until 1874.

Aytoun died at the age of 81 on either New Year's Day (1 January) or 14 May 1904.

References

External links

1823 births
1904 deaths
Members of the Parliament of the United Kingdom for Fife constituencies
Scottish Liberal Party MPs
UK MPs 1859–1865
UK MPs 1865–1868
UK MPs 1868–1874
Alumni of Trinity College, Cambridge
Deputy Lieutenants of Fife